The Diocesan School for Girls or DSG is a private boarding school for girls, situated in Makhanda (Grahamstown) in the Eastern Cape province of South Africa. It is one of the most expensive private girls' schools in South Africa.

Associated schools 

DSG shares close ties with other schools in Grahamstown: St. Andrew's College, a high school for boys and St. Andrew's Preparatory School, a co-educational primary school. Most girls enter the school in grade 4, coming from St. Andrew's Preparatory School. There are about 120 girls from grade 4 to grade 7 (the primary school phase) and 400 from grade 8 to grade 12 (the high school phase.) From grade 10 all the academic classes are shared with St. Andrew's College and are thus co-instructional. The DR Wynne Music School, and a design and technology centre are shared with St. Andrew's College.

Notable alumnae 
 Mary Rae Knowling, medical doctor, Anglican and philanthropist who boarding house, "Knowling" is named after
 Cecily Norden, author, senior horse judge, champion rider and exhibitor and stud breeder
 Josie Wood, educator, co-founder of the South African Library for the Blind and the South African National Council for the Blind

See more 
List of Boarding Schools

Further reading 
 Evergreen: The History of the Diocesan School for Girls, Grahamstown 1874–1999 by Harry Birrell

References

External links 

 
 Fundraiser site

Anglican schools in South Africa
Boarding schools in South Africa
Private schools in the Eastern Cape
Educational institutions established in 1874
Girls' schools in South Africa
Buildings and structures in Makhanda, Eastern Cape
1874 establishments in the Cape Colony